Colombia competed at the 2022 World Aquatics Championships in Budapest, Hungary from 18 June to 3 July.

Artistic swimming 

Colombia entered 4 artistic swimmers.

Women

Mixed

Diving

Colombia entered 8 divers.

Men

Women

Mixed

Open water swimming

Colombia entered 1 open water swimmer 

Men

Swimming

Colombia  entered 6 swimmers.
Men

Women

Water polo 

Summary

Women's tournament

Team roster

Group play

13–16th place semifinals

15th place game

References

Nations at the 2022 World Aquatics Championships
2022
World Aquatics Championships